Sands may refer to:
Multiple types of sand, granular material.
Sands or The Sands may also refer to:

Places
 Sands, Michigan, an unincorporated community
 Sands Township, Michigan, USA
 Sands Fjord, Greenland

People
 Sands (surname)

Casinos and resorts
Las Vegas Sands, a casino development company
Marina Bay Sands, in Singapore
Sands Atlantic City, a closed hotel/casino in Atlantic City, New Jersey
Sands Casino Resort Bethlehem,  casino and resort in Bethlehem, Pennsylvania (now under new ownership as Wind Creek Casino)
Sands Expo and Convention Center, in Las Vegas, Nevada
Sands Hotel, a closed hotel/casino in Las Vegas, Nevada 
Sands Macau, a casino in Macau
Sands Regency, in Reno, Nevada

Ships
 USNS Sands (T-AGOR-6), an oceanographic research ship that served the U.S. Navy
 USS Sands (DD-243/APD-13), destroyer in the U.S. Navy

Other uses 
 Sands (charity), formerly The Stillbirth and Neonatal Death Society, a UK charity
 David Sands, a convenience store chain, based in Fife and Perthshire, Scotland
 Inspector Sands or Mr Sands, an emergency code word used in public transport systems in the United Kingdom
 Sands School, an alternative, democratic school in the UK

See also
Golden Sands
Sand (disambiguation)